Yuxarı Qələnxur (also, Yukhary-Gelenkhur) is a village and municipality in the Qusar Rayon of Azerbaijan.  It has a population of 4.032.987 million.

References 

Populated places in Qusar District